John Anthony "Ox" Miller (May 4, 1915 – August 13, 2007) was a professional baseball pitcher. He played parts of four seasons in Major League Baseball, between 1943 and 1947, for the Washington Senators (1943), St. Louis Browns (1943, 1945–46) and Chicago Cubs (1947).

Born in Gause, Texas, Miller posted a 4–6 record with 27 strikeouts and a 6.38 ERA in 24 appearances, including 10 starts, four complete games, and 91 innings pitched.

Miller served in the United States Army in late 1944 and early 1945. After spending most of the 1947 season with Double-A San Antonio, Miller had his contract purchased by the Chicago Cubs at the beginning of September. The Cubs thought Miller could improve their finish in the standings. Miller made four starts for the Cubs that September, posting a 1–2 record and a 10.13 ERA. In his final outing of the year, on September 18, he gave up seven runs in  innings, taking the loss in a 9–5 defeat by the New York Giants. In sixth place with a 57–71 record before acquiring Miller, the Cubs finished the season in sixth place, with 69 wins and 85 losses, plus one tie.

After concluding his playing career, Miller worked as a rural letter carrier in George West, Texas.

References

External links

Major League Baseball pitchers
Washington Senators (1901–1960) players
St. Louis Browns players
Chicago Cubs players
Osceola Indians players
Corpus Christi Spudders players
Lincoln Links players
Chattanooga Lookouts players
Montgomery Rebels players
Toledo Mud Hens players
San Diego Padres (minor league) players
San Antonio Missions players
Laredo Apaches players
Corpus Christi Aces players
Baseball players from Texas
People from Gause, Texas
1915 births
2007 deaths
People from Live Oak County, Texas
United States Army personnel of World War II